Thesprotia subhyalina, common name grass mantis, is a species of mantis found in Brazil. It was originally identified as Oligonyx subhyalina.

References

subhyalina
Insects of Brazil
Insects described in 1870